Maty may refer to:

People with the given name
 Maty Diop (born 1988), Senegalese football player
 Maty Grunberg (born 1943), Israeli sculptor and writer
 Maty Mint Hamady (born 1967), Mauritanian economist and politician, current mayor of Nouakchott
 Maty Mauk (born 1993), American football quarterback
 Maty Noyes (born 1997), American singer-songwriter
 Maty Monfort, American actress and co-host of talk show Mike and Maty

People with the surname
 Matthew Maty (1716–1776), Dutch physician and writer
 Paul Henry Maty (1744–1787), British librarian

See also
 Matey (disambiguation)
 Mati (disambiguation)
 Matty (disambiguation)